The Cameroon Airlines Corporation, trading as Camair-Co, is an airline from Cameroon, serving as flag carrier of the country, a role which was previously filled by the now-defunct Cameroon Airlines. Camair-Co has its headquarters in the Immeuble La Rotonde in Douala, and operates out of Douala International Airport. The airline has never made a profit, and is struggling under the weight of its debts; most of its aircraft are currently grounded.

History

Camair-co was created on 11 September 2006 by decree of Paul Biya, the President of Cameroon, as a company aimed at replacing Cameroon Airlines, the country's national airline at that time. The IATA code QC previously belonged to Air Corridor, which has since ceased operations. Cameroon Airlines was shut down in June 2008, but it took until 2011 for Camair-Co to launch flight services. The inaugural flight from Douala to Paris via Yaoundé took place on 28 March. On 30 September 2016 the airline ceased services to Paris as part of a network restructuring exercise.

Lossmaking since its launch in 2011, the Camair-Co reportedly had debts about 35 billion Central African CFA franc, and the Agency for Aerial Navigation Safety in Africa and Madagascar (ASECNA) had ordered the company to pay its arrears of royalties amounting to 100,390 million FCFA, under suspension of air navigation services.

Camair-Co was the subject of a recovery plan proposed by the US firm Boeing Consulting in 2016, which included settlement of the outstanding debt, the injection of FCFA 60 billion, resizing of the network and the modernisation of the fleet, but the plan has not been implemented.

Corporate affairs

Ownership
Camair-Co, with a capital of 100 million CFA francs, was created by Presidential Decree No. 2006/293 of 11 September 2006 with the State of Cameroon as the sole shareholder.

Business trends
Camair-Co has been loss-making since its creation.  Financial and other trends for Camair-Co (for years ending 31 December) are:

Destinations

As of March 2018, Camair-Co offers scheduled flights to the following destinations:

Fleet

The Camair-Co fleet consists of the following aircraft (as of August 2019):
As of January 2022, the two B737-700s, registration TJ-QCA and TJ-QCB are parked outside the Ethiopian Airlines maintenance facilities at Bole International Airport, Addis Abbeba, Ethiopia. The B767-300 is parked at the apron, and is missing the right engine.
The airline is also operating at least one Embraer 145, registration TJ-KMM, which apparently belongs to Cronos Airlines of Equatorial Guinea.

See also
 Airlines of Africa

References

External links

Airlines of Cameroon
Airlines established in 2006
2006 establishments in Africa
Companies based in Douala